Brandon Smith (born 31 May 1996) is a New Zealand professional rugby league footballer who plays as a  and  for the Sydney Roosters in the NRL, and for  and the New Zealand Māori at international level.

Smith previously played for the Melbourne Storm with whom he won the 2020 NRL Grand Final.

Early life
Smith was born in Waiheke Island, New Zealand, and is of Norwegian and Māori descent.

He played his junior rugby league for the Waiheke Rams and Bay Roskill Young Guns in New Zealand.

He moved to Townsville as a teenager because his older brother Dylan Smith had an under 20s contract with the North Queensland Cowboys. In Townsville, he was educated at Kirwan State High School, Townsville where he played school-level football. He continued playing junior league with Centrals Tigers and Brothers in Townsville.

Playing career
Smith played for the North Queensland Cowboys in the National Youth Competition for two seasons, playing 44 games and scoring 30 tries. In May 2016, he played for the 2016 Junior Kiwis against the Junior Kangaroos. In September 2016, he was named at hooker in the Team of the Year. He signed a 3-year contract with the Melbourne Storm in the following month.

2017
On 30 April, Smith was named in the New Zealand national team's 20-man squad for the 2017 Anzac Test.

He made his NRL debut for the Melbourne Storm against the Knights in round 13, scoring a try. On 24 July, he signed a major contract extension with Melbourne, tying him to the club until the end of 2022, with the intention of his  becoming Cameron Smith’s replacement as hooker.

2018
At the beginning of the season he was part of the Melbourne Storm victorious 2018 World Club Challenge Team. In round 23, against the Eels, Smith demonstrated his gritty character by playing a vital role for his depleted team, displaying determination to win with an injured knee. Brandon was also part of the Melbourne Storm team that played in the 2018 NRL Grand Final.

On 13 October, Smith made his international debut for the New Zealand Kiwis against the Australian Kangaroos in Auckland.

2019
Smith played 23 games for Melbourne in the 2019 NRL season as the club finished as runaway minor premiers.  Smith played in the club's preliminary final loss to the Sydney Roosters at the Sydney Cricket Ground.

2020
Smith was selected as a part of the Māori All Stars winning team on the Gold Coast at the NRL All-Stars Match. He was awarded the Preston Campbell Medal for his two tries man of the match performance.  After the game it was revealed that Smith had suffered a facial fracture and was ruled out for 4–6 weeks.  On 2 July, in Round 8 of the Telstra Premiership, Smith played his 50th NRL game on Thursday Night Football against the Sydney Roosters. Smith started at hooker for the game.  He finished the season victorious playing off the bench in the 2020 NRL Grand Final against Penrith.

2021
Smith played a total of 24 games for Melbourne in the 2021 NRL season as the club won 19 matches in a row and claimed the Minor Premiership.  Smith played in all three finals matches including the preliminary final where Melbourne suffered a shock 10-6 loss against eventual premiers Penrith.

In September 2021, a video was leaked to the media which showed Smith along with Melbourne teammates Cameron Munster and Chris Lewis partying while Smith was taking an illicit substance which was alleged to be cocaine. Smith was handed a $50,000 suspended fine, a one match suspension and he was removed from Melbourne's emerging leadership group.

In November 2021, Smith was placed under heavy scrutiny for comments he made while being a guest on the YKTR podcast.  When being interviewed Smith stated he dreamed of winning a premiership in a Sydney Roosters jersey even though he was still contracted with Melbourne for the 2022 season.  Smith also claimed the Melbourne club had a big drinking culture and named several teammates being involved in drunken behaviour.   Smith was later placed under investigation by the NRL Integrity Unit over his appearance on the podcast.

On the 17 December, Smith officially signed with the Sydney Roosters, on a three-year deal starting in 2023.

2022
In round 1 of the 2022 NRL season, Smith was taken from the field with an injury early in the first half of the clubs match against the Wests Tigers.  It was later announced that Smith would be ruled out for a month with a broken hand.

In round 16 of the 2022 NRL season, Smith played his 100th NRL game in Melbourne's 36-30 loss against Manly.

The following week, Smith was sent to the sin bin for dissent during Melbourne's 28-6 loss against Cronulla.  As Smith left the field following his dismissal, he became involved in a verbal altercation with Cronulla supporters.

On 12 July, Smith was suspended for three matches over the incident.

In October Smith was named in the New Zealand squad for the 2021 Rugby League World Cup.

2023
In round 1 of the 2023 NRL season, Smith made his club debut for the Sydney Roosters as they suffered a shock loss to the newly admitted Dolphins team.

Honours
Individual
 Melbourne Storm Rookie of the Year: 2018
 Preston Campbell Medal: 2020
 Melbourne Storm Forward of the Year: 2020
 Melbourne Storm Forward of the Year: 2021
 Dally M Hooker of the Year: 2021

Club
 2018 NRL Grand Final Runner-up
 2019 Minor Premiership Winners
 2020 NRL Grand Final Winners
 2021 Minor Premiership Winners

References

External links
Melbourne Storm profile
Storm profile

1996 births
Living people
New Zealand rugby league players
New Zealand Māori rugby league players
New Zealand national rugby league team players
New Zealand Māori rugby league team players
New Zealand people of Norwegian descent
Melbourne Storm players
Junior Kiwis players
Sunshine Coast Falcons players
Rugby league hookers
Rugby league players from Auckland